The cranial root of accessory nerve (or part) is the smaller of the two portions of the accessory nerve. It is generally considered as a part of the vagus nerve and not part of the accessory nerve proper because the cranial component rapidly joins the vagus nerve and serves the same function as other vagal nerve fibers. Recently, the concept of a cranial root of the accessory nerve has been challenged by new neuroanatomical studies which found that an unambiguous cranial root was not present in the majority of the cases. However, a small study in 2007 followed by a substantially larger study published in 2012 both confirmed that the cranial root of the accessory nerve is commonly found in humans, matching traditional descriptions.

Path
The cranial root fibers arise from the cells of the nucleus ambiguus and emerge as four or five delicate rootlets from the side of the medulla oblongata, below the roots of the vagus.

It runs lateralward to the jugular foramen, where it may interchange fibers with the spinal portion or even become united to it for a short distance; here it is also connected by one or two filaments with the jugular ganglion of the vagus.

It then passes through the jugular foramen, separates from the spinal portion and is continued over the surface of the ganglion nodosum of the vagus, to the surface of which it is adherent, and is distributed principally to the pharyngeal and superior laryngeal branches of the vagus. Through the pharyngeal branch it probably supplies the Musculus uvulæ and Levator veli palatini. Some few filaments from it are continued into the trunk of the vagus below the ganglion, to be distributed with the recurrent nerve and probably also with the cardiac nerves.

Relationship to vagus
As the fibers from the presumptive cranial root may not join the accessory nerve at all or at best for a very short distance within the jugular foramen, it appears more useful to consider them in general to be part of the cranial roots of the vagal nerve. The accessory nerve would then be a pure motor nerve supplying the trapezius and sternocleidomastoid muscles, with the fibers originating from the spinal segments C1-C5 (the medullary root of the accessory nerve).

References 

Accessory nerve